Jean Graul (19 July 1924 – 1 April 2015) was a Swiss sailor. He competed in the 5.5 Metre event at the 1964 Summer Olympics.

References

External links
 

1924 births
2015 deaths
Swiss male sailors (sport)
Olympic sailors of Switzerland
Sailors at the 1964 Summer Olympics – 5.5 Metre
Place of birth missing
20th-century Swiss people